Municipal elections were held in Israel on 22 October 2013. Turnout was low, with only 43% of those eligible voting, compared to 51% in 2008.

In Jerusalem, the incumbent Nir Barkat won re-election with 52% against challenger Moshe Lion, who gained 45%, as did Tel Aviv's Mayor, Ron Huldai, who won re-election against Member of the Knesset Nitzan Horowitz from the Meretz Party.

See also
2013 Haifa mayoral election
2013 Jerusalem mayoral election
2013 Tel Aviv mayoral election

References

External links

Results at mako.co.il
Israel election results || Barkat retains Jerusalem, three mayors facing criminal charges re-elected, Haaretz

municipal
Municipal elections in Israel
Israel